Sheridan is an unincorporated community in Lincoln County, in the U.S. state of West Virginia.

History
A post office called Sheridan was established in 1887, and remained in operation until 1947. The community was named after Philip Sheridan, a Union general in the Civil War.

References

Unincorporated communities in Lincoln County, West Virginia
Unincorporated communities in West Virginia